The Machinations of Dementia is the sole studio album by the instrumental progressive metal band Blotted Science, released September 18, 2007, on guitarist Ron Jarzombek's EclecticElectric label.  It was issued in Japan on June 22, 2011, via Marquee/Avalon.

The album had been in the making since 2005, but progress stalled when original drummer Chris Adler had to bow out due to commitments with his band Lamb of God; his successor, Derek Roddy (ex-Nile, Hate Eternal), left over "musical differences" after a six-month tenure.

According to Ron Jarzombek, "75 percent" of The Machinations of Dementia was written utilizing the "Circle of 12 Tones", derived from the twelve-tone technique pioneered by Austrian-born composer Arnold Schoenberg in the 1920s.

Track listing

Music theory 
"Oscillation Cycles" is composed around a tone row of 12 notes played forward, and then backwards. The song only consists of these two note patterns, which then undergo temporal modulation and rhythmic changes.

"Adenosine Buildup" is "Adenosine Breakdown" played backwards.

Personnel
Ron Jarzombek - guitars
Alex Webster - bass
Charlie Zeleny - drums

Production
Arranged by Blotted Science
Produced and mixed by Ron Jarzombek
Guitars recorded by Ron Jarzombek at Live Oak Studios
Bass recorded by Alex Webster at Hell Whole Studios (editing by Ron Jarzombek)
Drums recorded and edited by Charlie Zeleny (at Doc Z Studios), with assistance from Ron Jarzombek
Mastered by Jacob Hansen
Copyright Spastic Music Publishing

References

External links
The Machinations of Dementia reviews archive @ RonJarzombek.com
The Machinations of Dementia @ Encyclopaedia Metallum

Blotted Science albums
2007 debut albums
Instrumental albums